Fovu Club de Baham is a Cameroonian football club based in Baham. They are a member of the Cameroonian Football Federation.  Their home stadium is Stade de Baham. The club is named after the Sacred Cave Fovu, one of the most sacred place.

Honours
Cameroon Premiere Division: 1
 2000

Cameroon Cup: 2
 2001, 2010

Super Coupe Roger Milla: 1

 2001 

CAF Champions League: 1 appearance
2001 - First Round

CAF Confederation Cup: 1 appearance
2011 - Preliminary Round

CAF Cup Winners' Cup: 1 appearance
2002 - Second Round

Football clubs in Cameroon
1978 establishments in Cameroon
Sports clubs in Cameroon